This is a partial list of unnumbered minor planets for principal provisional designations assigned during 16–30 November 2003. Since this period yielded a high number of provisional discoveries, it is further split into several standalone pages. , a total of 368 bodies remain unnumbered for this period. Objects for this year are listed on the following pages: A–E · F–G · H–L · M–R · Si · Sii · Siii · Siv · T · Ui · Uii · Uiii · Uiv · V · Wi · Wii and X–Y. Also see previous and next year.

W 

|- id="2003 WA200" bgcolor=#E9E9E9
| 0 ||  || MBA-M || 17.3 || 1.9 km || multiple || 2003–2021 || 04 Oct 2021 || 102 || align=left | Disc.: Spacewatch || 
|- id="2003 WB200" bgcolor=#fefefe
| 0 ||  || MBA-I || 18.55 || data-sort-value="0.58" | 580 m || multiple || 2003–2022 || 04 Jan 2022 || 61 || align=left | Disc.: LPL/Spacewatch II || 
|- id="2003 WC200" bgcolor=#E9E9E9
| 0 ||  || MBA-M || 17.6 || 1.3 km || multiple || 2003–2020 || 21 Oct 2020 || 115 || align=left | Disc.: Spacewatch || 
|- id="2003 WD200" bgcolor=#E9E9E9
| 0 ||  || MBA-M || 17.46 || 1.8 km || multiple || 2003–2021 || 11 Nov 2021 || 87 || align=left | Disc.: SDSS || 
|- id="2003 WE200" bgcolor=#fefefe
| 0 ||  || MBA-I || 18.4 || data-sort-value="0.62" | 620 m || multiple || 2003–2020 || 15 Dec 2020 || 79 || align=left | Disc.: Kitt Peak Obs. || 
|- id="2003 WG200" bgcolor=#E9E9E9
| 0 ||  || MBA-M || 17.2 || 1.1 km || multiple || 2003–2021 || 22 Jan 2021 || 70 || align=left | Disc.: Kitt Peak Obs.Alt.: 2005 JE68 || 
|- id="2003 WH200" bgcolor=#E9E9E9
| 0 ||  || MBA-M || 17.7 || 1.2 km || multiple || 2003–2020 || 10 Oct 2020 || 109 || align=left | Disc.: Kitt Peak Obs. || 
|- id="2003 WJ200" bgcolor=#fefefe
| 0 ||  || MBA-I || 18.67 || data-sort-value="0.55" | 550 m || multiple || 2003–2020 || 10 Dec 2020 || 50 || align=left | Disc.: Kitt Peak Obs. || 
|- id="2003 WK200" bgcolor=#E9E9E9
| 0 ||  || MBA-M || 17.3 || 1.9 km || multiple || 2003–2019 || 08 Jan 2019 || 47 || align=left | Disc.: Spacewatch || 
|- id="2003 WL200" bgcolor=#fefefe
| 0 ||  || MBA-I || 18.0 || data-sort-value="0.75" | 750 m || multiple || 2003–2020 || 17 Dec 2020 || 115 || align=left | Disc.: Kitt Peak Obs. || 
|- id="2003 WM200" bgcolor=#fefefe
| 0 ||  || MBA-I || 18.4 || data-sort-value="0.62" | 620 m || multiple || 2003–2020 || 07 Dec 2020 || 117 || align=left | Disc.: Spacewatch || 
|- id="2003 WO200" bgcolor=#fefefe
| 0 ||  || MBA-I || 18.3 || data-sort-value="0.65" | 650 m || multiple || 2003–2017 || 01 May 2017 || 52 || align=left | Disc.: Kitt Peak Obs. || 
|- id="2003 WP200" bgcolor=#fefefe
| 0 ||  || MBA-I || 18.2 || data-sort-value="0.68" | 680 m || multiple || 2003–2021 || 06 Jan 2021 || 55 || align=left | Disc.: Spacewatch || 
|- id="2003 WR200" bgcolor=#fefefe
| 0 ||  || MBA-I || 18.3 || data-sort-value="0.65" | 650 m || multiple || 2002–2019 || 22 Sep 2019 || 81 || align=left | Disc.: Kitt Peak Obs. || 
|- id="2003 WU200" bgcolor=#fefefe
| 0 ||  || MBA-I || 17.71 || data-sort-value="0.85" | 850 m || multiple || 2003–2021 || 09 May 2021 || 62 || align=left | Disc.: Spacewatch || 
|- id="2003 WV200" bgcolor=#E9E9E9
| 0 ||  || MBA-M || 17.20 || 1.1 km || multiple || 2003–2021 || 07 May 2021 || 101 || align=left | Disc.: Spacewatch || 
|- id="2003 WW200" bgcolor=#d6d6d6
| 0 ||  || MBA-O || 17.1 || 2.1 km || multiple || 1998–2020 || 16 May 2020 || 60 || align=left | Disc.: Spacewatch || 
|- id="2003 WX200" bgcolor=#d6d6d6
| 0 ||  || MBA-O || 15.8 || 3.9 km || multiple || 2003–2021 || 15 Jan 2021 || 87 || align=left | Disc.: SDSS || 
|- id="2003 WY200" bgcolor=#d6d6d6
| 0 ||  || MBA-O || 17.3 || 1.9 km || multiple || 2003–2020 || 26 Apr 2020 || 48 || align=left | Disc.: Spacewatch || 
|- id="2003 WA201" bgcolor=#fefefe
| 0 ||  || MBA-I || 18.25 || data-sort-value="0.67" | 670 m || multiple || 2003–2021 || 03 Aug 2021 || 64 || align=left | Disc.: LPL/Spacewatch II || 
|- id="2003 WE201" bgcolor=#fefefe
| 0 ||  || MBA-I || 18.69 || data-sort-value="0.54" | 540 m || multiple || 2003–2021 || 15 Apr 2021 || 84 || align=left | Disc.: Kitt Peak Obs. || 
|- id="2003 WF201" bgcolor=#E9E9E9
| 0 ||  || MBA-M || 18.22 || 1.3 km || multiple || 2003–2021 || 27 Nov 2021 || 98 || align=left | Disc.: Spacewatch || 
|- id="2003 WG201" bgcolor=#E9E9E9
| 0 ||  || MBA-M || 17.5 || 1.8 km || multiple || 2003–2021 || 27 Sep 2021 || 72 || align=left | Disc.: Spacewatch || 
|- id="2003 WJ201" bgcolor=#E9E9E9
| 0 ||  || MBA-M || 17.6 || 1.7 km || multiple || 2003–2020 || 13 Sep 2020 || 44 || align=left | Disc.: Kitt Peak Obs. || 
|- id="2003 WK201" bgcolor=#fefefe
| 0 ||  || MBA-I || 18.7 || data-sort-value="0.54" | 540 m || multiple || 2003–2017 || 22 Nov 2017 || 40 || align=left | Disc.: Spacewatch || 
|- id="2003 WL201" bgcolor=#fefefe
| 0 ||  || MBA-I || 18.34 || data-sort-value="0.64" | 640 m || multiple || 2003–2021 || 09 Apr 2021 || 74 || align=left | Disc.: Spacewatch || 
|- id="2003 WM201" bgcolor=#E9E9E9
| 1 ||  || MBA-M || 18.1 || data-sort-value="0.71" | 710 m || multiple || 2003–2021 || 18 Jan 2021 || 50 || align=left | Disc.: LPL/Spacewatch II || 
|- id="2003 WN201" bgcolor=#E9E9E9
| 0 ||  || MBA-M || 17.49 || 1.8 km || multiple || 2003–2021 || 09 Nov 2021 || 55 || align=left | Disc.: LPL/Spacewatch II || 
|- id="2003 WO201" bgcolor=#d6d6d6
| 0 ||  || MBA-O || 17.43 || 1.8 km || multiple || 2003–2021 || 11 Jul 2021 || 52 || align=left | Disc.: Spacewatch || 
|- id="2003 WQ201" bgcolor=#fefefe
| 0 ||  || MBA-I || 18.28 || data-sort-value="0.66" | 660 m || multiple || 1996–2022 || 27 Jan 2022 || 75 || align=left | Disc.: Spacewatch || 
|- id="2003 WR201" bgcolor=#E9E9E9
| 0 ||  || MBA-M || 17.91 || 1.5 km || multiple || 2003–2021 || 26 Nov 2021 || 87 || align=left | Disc.: Spacewatch || 
|- id="2003 WS201" bgcolor=#E9E9E9
| 0 ||  || MBA-M || 17.6 || data-sort-value="0.90" | 900 m || multiple || 2003–2021 || 14 Jan 2021 || 108 || align=left | Disc.: Spacewatch || 
|- id="2003 WT201" bgcolor=#d6d6d6
| 0 ||  || MBA-O || 16.89 || 2.3 km || multiple || 2003–2022 || 25 Jan 2022 || 66 || align=left | Disc.: Spacewatch || 
|- id="2003 WU201" bgcolor=#d6d6d6
| 0 ||  || MBA-O || 17.32 || 1.9 km || multiple || 2003–2021 || 09 May 2021 || 67 || align=left | Disc.: Kitt Peak Obs. || 
|- id="2003 WV201" bgcolor=#E9E9E9
| 0 ||  || MBA-M || 17.43 || 1.8 km || multiple || 2003–2021 || 02 Dec 2021 || 107 || align=left | Disc.: SpacewatchAlt.: 2015 HX92 || 
|- id="2003 WW201" bgcolor=#fefefe
| 0 ||  || MBA-I || 17.5 || data-sort-value="0.94" | 940 m || multiple || 2003–2020 || 17 Apr 2020 || 56 || align=left | Disc.: LPL/Spacewatch II || 
|- id="2003 WX201" bgcolor=#d6d6d6
| 0 ||  || MBA-O || 17.65 || 1.6 km || multiple || 2003–2020 || 19 Apr 2020 || 48 || align=left | Disc.: Spacewatch || 
|- id="2003 WY201" bgcolor=#E9E9E9
| 0 ||  || MBA-M || 17.6 || 1.3 km || multiple || 2003–2020 || 17 Dec 2020 || 120 || align=left | Disc.: Kitt Peak Obs. || 
|- id="2003 WA202" bgcolor=#E9E9E9
| 0 ||  || MBA-M || 16.96 || 2.3 km || multiple || 2003–2021 || 28 Nov 2021 || 130 || align=left | Disc.: Spacewatch || 
|- id="2003 WB202" bgcolor=#fefefe
| 0 ||  || MBA-I || 18.4 || data-sort-value="0.62" | 620 m || multiple || 2003–2020 || 07 Dec 2020 || 72 || align=left | Disc.: Spacewatch || 
|- id="2003 WD202" bgcolor=#fefefe
| 0 ||  || MBA-I || 18.3 || data-sort-value="0.65" | 650 m || multiple || 2003–2020 || 18 Nov 2020 || 61 || align=left | Disc.: LPL/Spacewatch II || 
|- id="2003 WE202" bgcolor=#E9E9E9
| 0 ||  || MBA-M || 17.59 || 1.7 km || multiple || 2003–2021 || 10 Sep 2021 || 52 || align=left | Disc.: SDSS || 
|- id="2003 WG202" bgcolor=#d6d6d6
| 0 ||  || MBA-O || 16.9 || 2.3 km || multiple || 2003–2021 || 18 Jan 2021 || 50 || align=left | Disc.: SDSS || 
|- id="2003 WH202" bgcolor=#d6d6d6
| 0 ||  || MBA-O || 17.44 || 1.8 km || multiple || 2003–2021 || 17 Apr 2021 || 43 || align=left | Disc.: Spacewatch || 
|- id="2003 WJ202" bgcolor=#fefefe
| 0 ||  || MBA-I || 18.6 || data-sort-value="0.57" | 570 m || multiple || 2003–2020 || 24 Dec 2020 || 48 || align=left | Disc.: Spacewatch || 
|- id="2003 WK202" bgcolor=#fefefe
| 0 ||  || MBA-I || 18.8 || data-sort-value="0.52" | 520 m || multiple || 2003–2020 || 22 Mar 2020 || 62 || align=left | Disc.: Spacewatch || 
|- id="2003 WL202" bgcolor=#E9E9E9
| 0 ||  || MBA-M || 17.69 || 1.6 km || multiple || 2003–2021 || 09 Dec 2021 || 68 || align=left | Disc.: LPL/Spacewatch II || 
|- id="2003 WM202" bgcolor=#fefefe
| 0 ||  || MBA-I || 18.17 || data-sort-value="0.69" | 690 m || multiple || 2003–2021 || 30 Nov 2021 || 109 || align=left | Disc.: Kitt Peak Obs. || 
|- id="2003 WN202" bgcolor=#d6d6d6
| 0 ||  || MBA-O || 16.6 || 2.7 km || multiple || 2003–2020 || 11 Dec 2020 || 65 || align=left | Disc.: Spacewatch || 
|- id="2003 WO202" bgcolor=#fefefe
| 0 ||  || MBA-I || 19.16 || data-sort-value="0.44" | 440 m || multiple || 2003–2021 || 09 Dec 2021 || 42 || align=left | Disc.: Spacewatch || 
|- id="2003 WP202" bgcolor=#fefefe
| 3 ||  || MBA-I || 18.8 || data-sort-value="0.52" | 520 m || multiple || 2003–2020 || 14 Aug 2020 || 43 || align=left | Disc.: Spacewatch || 
|- id="2003 WQ202" bgcolor=#fefefe
| 0 ||  || MBA-I || 18.8 || data-sort-value="0.52" | 520 m || multiple || 2003–2019 || 24 Jul 2019 || 51 || align=left | Disc.: Spacewatch || 
|- id="2003 WR202" bgcolor=#fefefe
| 0 ||  || MBA-I || 18.5 || data-sort-value="0.59" | 590 m || multiple || 2003–2020 || 11 Dec 2020 || 84 || align=left | Disc.: Spacewatch || 
|- id="2003 WT202" bgcolor=#d6d6d6
| 0 ||  || MBA-O || 16.07 || 3.4 km || multiple || 2001–2022 || 25 Jan 2022 || 75 || align=left | Disc.: LPL/Spacewatch II || 
|- id="2003 WU202" bgcolor=#fefefe
| 1 ||  || MBA-I || 18.62 || data-sort-value="0.56" | 560 m || multiple || 2003–2022 || 22 Jan 2022 || 60 || align=left | Disc.: Spacewatch || 
|- id="2003 WV202" bgcolor=#E9E9E9
| 0 ||  || MBA-M || 17.4 || 1.4 km || multiple || 2003–2020 || 21 Dec 2020 || 107 || align=left | Disc.: Spacewatch || 
|- id="2003 WW202" bgcolor=#fefefe
| 0 ||  || MBA-I || 18.84 || data-sort-value="0.51" | 510 m || multiple || 2003–2021 || 27 Dec 2021 || 58 || align=left | Disc.: LPL/Spacewatch II || 
|- id="2003 WX202" bgcolor=#E9E9E9
| 1 ||  || MBA-M || 17.2 || 1.1 km || multiple || 2003–2019 || 31 Oct 2019 || 45 || align=left | Disc.: Spacewatch || 
|- id="2003 WY202" bgcolor=#fefefe
| 0 ||  || MBA-I || 17.8 || data-sort-value="0.82" | 820 m || multiple || 2003–2020 || 19 Jan 2020 || 46 || align=left | Disc.: Spacewatch || 
|- id="2003 WZ202" bgcolor=#fefefe
| 1 ||  || MBA-I || 18.3 || data-sort-value="0.65" | 650 m || multiple || 2003–2019 || 29 Nov 2019 || 102 || align=left | Disc.: Spacewatch || 
|- id="2003 WA203" bgcolor=#E9E9E9
| 0 ||  || MBA-M || 17.23 || 2.0 km || multiple || 2003–2022 || 05 Jan 2022 || 52 || align=left | Disc.: LPL/Spacewatch II || 
|- id="2003 WB203" bgcolor=#fefefe
| 0 ||  || MBA-I || 18.7 || data-sort-value="0.54" | 540 m || multiple || 2002–2019 || 26 Oct 2019 || 65 || align=left | Disc.: Kitt Peak Obs. || 
|- id="2003 WC203" bgcolor=#fefefe
| 0 ||  || MBA-I || 19.0 || data-sort-value="0.47" | 470 m || multiple || 2003–2020 || 23 Aug 2020 || 37 || align=left | Disc.: Spacewatch || 
|- id="2003 WD203" bgcolor=#E9E9E9
| 0 ||  || MBA-M || 17.4 || 1.4 km || multiple || 2003–2020 || 16 Nov 2020 || 61 || align=left | Disc.: SDSS || 
|- id="2003 WF203" bgcolor=#fefefe
| 0 ||  || MBA-I || 18.5 || data-sort-value="0.59" | 590 m || multiple || 2003–2019 || 23 Sep 2019 || 56 || align=left | Disc.: Spacewatch || 
|- id="2003 WG203" bgcolor=#E9E9E9
| 0 ||  || MBA-M || 17.9 || 1.1 km || multiple || 2003–2021 || 13 Jan 2021 || 45 || align=left | Disc.: Spacewatch || 
|- id="2003 WJ203" bgcolor=#fefefe
| 0 ||  || MBA-I || 18.5 || data-sort-value="0.59" | 590 m || multiple || 2003–2020 || 10 Sep 2020 || 53 || align=left | Disc.: LPL/Spacewatch II || 
|- id="2003 WK203" bgcolor=#fefefe
| 0 ||  || MBA-I || 18.6 || data-sort-value="0.57" | 570 m || multiple || 1996–2020 || 17 Nov 2020 || 107 || align=left | Disc.: SpacewatchAlt.: 1996 TR34 || 
|- id="2003 WL203" bgcolor=#d6d6d6
| 0 ||  || MBA-O || 17.88 || 1.5 km || multiple || 2003–2021 || 10 Aug 2021 || 45 || align=left | Disc.: Kitt Peak Obs. || 
|- id="2003 WM203" bgcolor=#fefefe
| 1 ||  || MBA-I || 18.5 || data-sort-value="0.59" | 590 m || multiple || 2003–2020 || 20 Nov 2020 || 97 || align=left | Disc.: Spacewatch || 
|- id="2003 WN203" bgcolor=#E9E9E9
| 0 ||  || MBA-M || 17.5 || data-sort-value="0.94" | 940 m || multiple || 2003–2021 || 12 Jan 2021 || 60 || align=left | Disc.: Spacewatch || 
|- id="2003 WO203" bgcolor=#fefefe
| 1 ||  || MBA-I || 18.5 || data-sort-value="0.59" | 590 m || multiple || 2003–2020 || 02 Feb 2020 || 49 || align=left | Disc.: Kitt Peak Obs. || 
|- id="2003 WP203" bgcolor=#E9E9E9
| 0 ||  || MBA-M || 17.86 || 1.5 km || multiple || 2003–2021 || 09 Aug 2021 || 39 || align=left | Disc.: Spacewatch || 
|- id="2003 WQ203" bgcolor=#E9E9E9
| 0 ||  || MBA-M || 17.3 || 1.0 km || multiple || 2003–2021 || 17 Jan 2021 || 63 || align=left | Disc.: Kitt Peak Obs. || 
|- id="2003 WR203" bgcolor=#E9E9E9
| 0 ||  || MBA-M || 17.87 || 1.1 km || multiple || 2003–2022 || 26 Jan 2022 || 66 || align=left | Disc.: LPL/Spacewatch II || 
|- id="2003 WS203" bgcolor=#E9E9E9
| 0 ||  || MBA-M || 18.26 || 1.2 km || multiple || 2003–2021 || 08 Dec 2021 || 53 || align=left | Disc.: Spacewatch || 
|- id="2003 WT203" bgcolor=#d6d6d6
| 0 ||  || MBA-O || 17.21 || 2.0 km || multiple || 2003–2021 || 12 May 2021 || 106 || align=left | Disc.: SpacewatchAlt.: 2010 JP63, 2015 BQ15 || 
|- id="2003 WU203" bgcolor=#E9E9E9
| 0 ||  || MBA-M || 17.8 || data-sort-value="0.82" | 820 m || multiple || 2003–2020 || 17 Dec 2020 || 48 || align=left | Disc.: LPL/Spacewatch II || 
|- id="2003 WV203" bgcolor=#E9E9E9
| 2 ||  || MBA-M || 19.0 || data-sort-value="0.47" | 470 m || multiple || 2003–2015 || 11 Aug 2015 || 28 || align=left | Disc.: Spacewatch || 
|- id="2003 WW203" bgcolor=#E9E9E9
| 0 ||  || MBA-M || 16.79 || 1.8 km || multiple || 2003–2022 || 27 Jan 2022 || 80 || align=left | Disc.: SDSS || 
|- id="2003 WX203" bgcolor=#E9E9E9
| 0 ||  || MBA-M || 17.8 || 1.2 km || multiple || 2003–2020 || 17 Dec 2020 || 36 || align=left | Disc.: Spacewatch || 
|- id="2003 WY203" bgcolor=#fefefe
| 1 ||  || MBA-I || 18.74 || data-sort-value="0.53" | 530 m || multiple || 2003–2022 || 07 Jan 2022 || 33 || align=left | Disc.: Spacewatch || 
|- id="2003 WZ203" bgcolor=#fefefe
| 0 ||  || MBA-I || 18.6 || data-sort-value="0.57" | 570 m || multiple || 2003–2020 || 10 Nov 2020 || 67 || align=left | Disc.: Spacewatch || 
|- id="2003 WA204" bgcolor=#fefefe
| 0 ||  || MBA-I || 19.56 || data-sort-value="0.36" | 360 m || multiple || 2003–2022 || 25 Jan 2022 || 41 || align=left | Disc.: Spacewatch || 
|- id="2003 WB204" bgcolor=#fefefe
| 0 ||  || MBA-I || 18.31 || data-sort-value="0.65" | 650 m || multiple || 2003–2021 || 08 Aug 2021 || 54 || align=left | Disc.: SpacewatchAlt.: 2016 BT7 || 
|- id="2003 WC204" bgcolor=#E9E9E9
| 0 ||  || MBA-M || 17.61 || 1.7 km || multiple || 2003–2021 || 30 Nov 2021 || 41 || align=left | Disc.: Spacewatch || 
|- id="2003 WD204" bgcolor=#d6d6d6
| 0 ||  || MBA-O || 16.75 || 2.5 km || multiple || 2003–2022 || 08 Jan 2022 || 46 || align=left | Disc.: Spacewatch || 
|- id="2003 WF204" bgcolor=#fefefe
| 0 ||  || MBA-I || 18.8 || data-sort-value="0.52" | 520 m || multiple || 2003–2021 || 03 Jan 2021 || 56 || align=left | Disc.: Spacewatch || 
|- id="2003 WG204" bgcolor=#E9E9E9
| 1 ||  || MBA-M || 17.98 || 1.4 km || multiple || 2003–2021 || 09 Dec 2021 || 65 || align=left | Disc.: Spacewatch || 
|- id="2003 WH204" bgcolor=#d6d6d6
| 0 ||  || MBA-O || 16.8 || 2.4 km || multiple || 2003–2019 || 28 Nov 2019 || 49 || align=left | Disc.: Spacewatch || 
|- id="2003 WJ204" bgcolor=#d6d6d6
| 0 ||  || MBA-O || 16.9 || 2.3 km || multiple || 2003–2021 || 04 Jan 2021 || 56 || align=left | Disc.: Spacewatch || 
|- id="2003 WK204" bgcolor=#E9E9E9
| 0 ||  || MBA-M || 18.02 || 1.0 km || multiple || 2003–2022 || 27 Jan 2022 || 42 || align=left | Disc.: Spacewatch || 
|- id="2003 WL204" bgcolor=#fefefe
| 0 ||  || MBA-I || 18.7 || data-sort-value="0.54" | 540 m || multiple || 2003–2020 || 07 Oct 2020 || 67 || align=left | Disc.: Kitt Peak Obs. || 
|- id="2003 WM204" bgcolor=#fefefe
| 0 ||  || MBA-I || 18.64 || data-sort-value="0.56" | 560 m || multiple || 2003–2021 || 26 Nov 2021 || 67 || align=left | Disc.: Kitt Peak Obs.Alt.: 2010 OU32 || 
|- id="2003 WN204" bgcolor=#d6d6d6
| 1 ||  || MBA-O || 17.1 || 2.1 km || multiple || 2003–2021 || 18 Jan 2021 || 40 || align=left | Disc.: Kitt Peak Obs. || 
|- id="2003 WO204" bgcolor=#d6d6d6
| 0 ||  || MBA-O || 17.1 || 2.1 km || multiple || 2003–2021 || 10 Jan 2021 || 43 || align=left | Disc.: Spacewatch || 
|- id="2003 WP204" bgcolor=#fefefe
| 2 ||  || HUN || 18.9 || data-sort-value="0.49" | 490 m || multiple || 2003–2021 || 14 Jan 2021 || 47 || align=left | Disc.: Spacewatch || 
|- id="2003 WQ204" bgcolor=#fefefe
| 1 ||  || MBA-I || 18.9 || data-sort-value="0.49" | 490 m || multiple || 1994–2020 || 24 Oct 2020 || 42 || align=left | Disc.: Spacewatch || 
|- id="2003 WR204" bgcolor=#E9E9E9
| 0 ||  || MBA-M || 17.8 || 1.2 km || multiple || 2003–2021 || 05 Jan 2021 || 104 || align=left | Disc.: LONEOS || 
|- id="2003 WS204" bgcolor=#E9E9E9
| 0 ||  || MBA-M || 18.16 || data-sort-value="0.69" | 690 m || multiple || 2003–2021 || 09 Apr 2021 || 54 || align=left | Disc.: Spacewatch || 
|- id="2003 WT204" bgcolor=#fefefe
| 0 ||  || MBA-I || 18.82 || data-sort-value="0.51" | 510 m || multiple || 2003–2021 || 09 Nov 2021 || 60 || align=left | Disc.: Spacewatch || 
|- id="2003 WU204" bgcolor=#E9E9E9
| 0 ||  || MBA-M || 17.9 || data-sort-value="0.78" | 780 m || multiple || 2003–2020 || 12 Dec 2020 || 33 || align=left | Disc.: Spacewatch || 
|- id="2003 WV204" bgcolor=#d6d6d6
| 0 ||  || MBA-O || 17.4 || 1.8 km || multiple || 2003–2021 || 05 Jan 2021 || 44 || align=left | Disc.: SDSSAlt.: 2010 EO153 || 
|- id="2003 WW204" bgcolor=#d6d6d6
| 0 ||  || MBA-O || 17.0 || 2.2 km || multiple || 2001–2020 || 10 Dec 2020 || 97 || align=left | Disc.: SDSS || 
|- id="2003 WX204" bgcolor=#E9E9E9
| 0 ||  || MBA-M || 17.4 || data-sort-value="0.98" | 980 m || multiple || 2003–2021 || 07 Jan 2021 || 88 || align=left | Disc.: Spacewatch || 
|- id="2003 WA205" bgcolor=#d6d6d6
| 0 ||  || MBA-O || 16.5 || 2.8 km || multiple || 2003–2020 || 09 Dec 2020 || 100 || align=left | Disc.: SDSSAlt.: 2010 DE89 || 
|- id="2003 WB205" bgcolor=#fefefe
| 0 ||  || MBA-I || 17.2 || 1.1 km || multiple || 2003–2021 || 07 Jun 2021 || 140 || align=left | Disc.: LONEOS || 
|- id="2003 WC205" bgcolor=#d6d6d6
| 0 ||  || MBA-O || 16.8 || 2.4 km || multiple || 2003–2019 || 08 Nov 2019 || 76 || align=left | Disc.: Kitt Peak Obs. || 
|- id="2003 WD205" bgcolor=#d6d6d6
| 0 ||  || MBA-O || 16.68 || 2.6 km || multiple || 1997–2021 || 07 Apr 2021 || 103 || align=left | Disc.: Spacewatch || 
|- id="2003 WE205" bgcolor=#fefefe
| 0 ||  || MBA-I || 19.0 || data-sort-value="0.47" | 470 m || multiple || 2002–2019 || 01 Nov 2019 || 75 || align=left | Disc.: Spacewatch || 
|- id="2003 WF205" bgcolor=#d6d6d6
| 0 ||  || MBA-O || 16.5 || 2.8 km || multiple || 2003–2019 || 20 Dec 2019 || 80 || align=left | Disc.: Spacewatch || 
|- id="2003 WG205" bgcolor=#d6d6d6
| 0 ||  || MBA-O || 17.2 || 2.0 km || multiple || 2003–2019 || 28 Nov 2019 || 74 || align=left | Disc.: Spacewatch || 
|- id="2003 WH205" bgcolor=#d6d6d6
| 0 ||  || MBA-O || 17.0 || 2.2 km || multiple || 2003–2019 || 25 Nov 2019 || 72 || align=left | Disc.: Spacewatch || 
|- id="2003 WJ205" bgcolor=#E9E9E9
| 0 ||  || MBA-M || 17.4 || data-sort-value="0.98" | 980 m || multiple || 2003–2021 || 24 Jan 2021 || 84 || align=left | Disc.: Spacewatch || 
|- id="2003 WK205" bgcolor=#d6d6d6
| 0 ||  || MBA-O || 16.5 || 2.8 km || multiple || 2003–2020 || 22 Dec 2020 || 76 || align=left | Disc.: Kitt Peak Obs. || 
|- id="2003 WL205" bgcolor=#d6d6d6
| 0 ||  || MBA-O || 16.8 || 2.4 km || multiple || 2003–2021 || 18 Jan 2021 || 75 || align=left | Disc.: Spacewatch || 
|- id="2003 WM205" bgcolor=#d6d6d6
| 0 ||  || MBA-O || 16.40 || 2.9 km || multiple || 2003–2021 || 03 Apr 2021 || 114 || align=left | Disc.: Spacewatch || 
|- id="2003 WO205" bgcolor=#d6d6d6
| 0 ||  || MBA-O || 16.5 || 2.8 km || multiple || 1997–2019 || 29 Nov 2019 || 76 || align=left | Disc.: SDSS || 
|- id="2003 WP205" bgcolor=#d6d6d6
| 0 ||  || MBA-O || 16.7 || 2.5 km || multiple || 2003–2021 || 06 Jan 2021 || 75 || align=left | Disc.: Kitt Peak Obs. || 
|- id="2003 WQ205" bgcolor=#d6d6d6
| 0 ||  || MBA-O || 16.8 || 2.4 km || multiple || 2003–2020 || 08 Dec 2020 || 80 || align=left | Disc.: Spacewatch || 
|- id="2003 WR205" bgcolor=#d6d6d6
| 0 ||  || MBA-O || 16.4 || 2.9 km || multiple || 2003–2020 || 22 Dec 2020 || 72 || align=left | Disc.: Spacewatch || 
|- id="2003 WS205" bgcolor=#d6d6d6
| 0 ||  || MBA-O || 16.8 || 2.4 km || multiple || 2003–2021 || 15 Jan 2021 || 88 || align=left | Disc.: SpacewatchAlt.: 2010 CM174 || 
|- id="2003 WU205" bgcolor=#d6d6d6
| 0 ||  || MBA-O || 15.9 || 3.7 km || multiple || 2003–2020 || 11 May 2020 || 97 || align=left | Disc.: Spacewatch || 
|- id="2003 WV205" bgcolor=#d6d6d6
| 0 ||  || MBA-O || 16.6 || 2.7 km || multiple || 2003–2021 || 12 Jan 2021 || 67 || align=left | Disc.: Spacewatch || 
|- id="2003 WW205" bgcolor=#d6d6d6
| 0 ||  || MBA-O || 16.5 || 2.8 km || multiple || 2003–2019 || 17 Dec 2019 || 80 || align=left | Disc.: Spacewatch || 
|- id="2003 WX205" bgcolor=#fefefe
| 0 ||  || MBA-I || 18.4 || data-sort-value="0.62" | 620 m || multiple || 2003–2021 || 08 Jan 2021 || 75 || align=left | Disc.: Spacewatch || 
|- id="2003 WZ205" bgcolor=#d6d6d6
| 0 ||  || MBA-O || 16.6 || 2.7 km || multiple || 2003–2020 || 22 Dec 2020 || 72 || align=left | Disc.: Kitt Peak Obs. || 
|- id="2003 WB206" bgcolor=#d6d6d6
| 0 ||  || MBA-O || 16.7 || 2.5 km || multiple || 2003–2021 || 17 Jan 2021 || 62 || align=left | Disc.: Kitt Peak Obs. || 
|- id="2003 WC206" bgcolor=#d6d6d6
| 0 ||  || MBA-O || 16.8 || 2.4 km || multiple || 2003–2021 || 18 Jan 2021 || 68 || align=left | Disc.: Spacewatch || 
|- id="2003 WD206" bgcolor=#d6d6d6
| 2 ||  || MBA-O || 17.3 || 1.9 km || multiple || 2003–2019 || 28 Nov 2019 || 56 || align=left | Disc.: Kitt Peak Obs. || 
|- id="2003 WE206" bgcolor=#d6d6d6
| 0 ||  || MBA-O || 17.0 || 2.2 km || multiple || 2003–2019 || 08 Nov 2019 || 58 || align=left | Disc.: SDSS || 
|- id="2003 WF206" bgcolor=#d6d6d6
| 0 ||  || MBA-O || 16.4 || 2.9 km || multiple || 2003–2021 || 04 Jan 2021 || 89 || align=left | Disc.: SpacewatchAlt.: 2017 HQ64 || 
|- id="2003 WH206" bgcolor=#d6d6d6
| 0 ||  || MBA-O || 17.1 || 2.1 km || multiple || 1998–2020 || 21 Apr 2020 || 71 || align=left | Disc.: Spacewatch || 
|- id="2003 WJ206" bgcolor=#d6d6d6
| 0 ||  || MBA-O || 17.70 || 1.6 km || multiple || 2003–2021 || 31 Aug 2021 || 76 || align=left | Disc.: Spacewatch || 
|- id="2003 WK206" bgcolor=#fefefe
| 0 ||  || HUN || 18.47 || data-sort-value="0.60" | 600 m || multiple || 2003–2021 || 16 Apr 2021 || 85 || align=left | Disc.: Spacewatch || 
|- id="2003 WL206" bgcolor=#d6d6d6
| 0 ||  || MBA-O || 16.81 || 2.4 km || multiple || 2003–2021 || 07 Apr 2021 || 64 || align=left | Disc.: Spacewatch || 
|- id="2003 WM206" bgcolor=#E9E9E9
| 1 ||  || MBA-M || 17.8 || data-sort-value="0.82" | 820 m || multiple || 2003–2019 || 31 Dec 2019 || 79 || align=left | Disc.: Kitt Peak Obs. || 
|- id="2003 WN206" bgcolor=#d6d6d6
| 0 ||  || MBA-O || 16.7 || 2.5 km || multiple || 2003–2020 || 22 Dec 2020 || 65 || align=left | Disc.: LPL/Spacewatch II || 
|- id="2003 WO206" bgcolor=#d6d6d6
| 0 ||  || MBA-O || 17.07 || 2.1 km || multiple || 2003–2021 || 07 Apr 2021 || 124 || align=left | Disc.: Spacewatch || 
|- id="2003 WQ206" bgcolor=#d6d6d6
| 2 ||  || MBA-O || 17.1 || 2.1 km || multiple || 2003–2020 || 28 Jan 2020 || 62 || align=left | Disc.: Spacewatch || 
|- id="2003 WR206" bgcolor=#d6d6d6
| 0 ||  || MBA-O || 16.5 || 2.8 km || multiple || 2003–2019 || 29 Nov 2019 || 57 || align=left | Disc.: Spacewatch || 
|- id="2003 WT206" bgcolor=#fefefe
| 0 ||  || MBA-I || 18.3 || data-sort-value="0.65" | 650 m || multiple || 2003–2020 || 16 Dec 2020 || 67 || align=left | Disc.: Spacewatch || 
|- id="2003 WU206" bgcolor=#d6d6d6
| 0 ||  || MBA-O || 17.53 || 1.7 km || multiple || 2003–2021 || 08 May 2021 || 75 || align=left | Disc.: Spacewatch || 
|- id="2003 WV206" bgcolor=#d6d6d6
| 0 ||  || MBA-O || 17.54 || 1.7 km || multiple || 1998–2021 || 03 May 2021 || 73 || align=left | Disc.: Spacewatch || 
|- id="2003 WW206" bgcolor=#d6d6d6
| 0 ||  || MBA-O || 16.5 || 2.8 km || multiple || 2003–2021 || 17 Jan 2021 || 68 || align=left | Disc.: Spacewatch || 
|- id="2003 WX206" bgcolor=#E9E9E9
| 0 ||  || MBA-M || 17.89 || 1.1 km || multiple || 2001–2021 || 30 Nov 2021 || 124 || align=left | Disc.: Kitt Peak Obs. || 
|- id="2003 WY206" bgcolor=#E9E9E9
| 0 ||  || MBA-M || 17.6 || data-sort-value="0.90" | 900 m || multiple || 2003–2019 || 19 Dec 2019 || 68 || align=left | Disc.: Spacewatch || 
|- id="2003 WZ206" bgcolor=#E9E9E9
| 0 ||  || MBA-M || 18.2 || data-sort-value="0.68" | 680 m || multiple || 2003–2019 || 26 Nov 2019 || 48 || align=left | Disc.: SDSS || 
|- id="2003 WA207" bgcolor=#E9E9E9
| 0 ||  || MBA-M || 17.68 || 1.6 km || multiple || 2003–2021 || 01 Nov 2021 || 55 || align=left | Disc.: Kitt Peak Obs. || 
|- id="2003 WB207" bgcolor=#d6d6d6
| 0 ||  || MBA-O || 16.6 || 2.7 km || multiple || 2003–2020 || 18 Dec 2020 || 65 || align=left | Disc.: Spacewatch || 
|- id="2003 WD207" bgcolor=#d6d6d6
| 0 ||  || MBA-O || 17.31 || 1.9 km || multiple || 2003–2021 || 30 Jun 2021 || 91 || align=left | Disc.: LPL/Spacewatch II || 
|- id="2003 WE207" bgcolor=#d6d6d6
| 0 ||  || MBA-O || 17.0 || 2.2 km || multiple || 2003–2019 || 31 Oct 2019 || 55 || align=left | Disc.: Spacewatch || 
|- id="2003 WF207" bgcolor=#d6d6d6
| 0 ||  || MBA-O || 16.19 || 3.2 km || multiple || 2003–2022 || 16 Jan 2022 || 103 || align=left | Disc.: SpacewatchAlt.: 2010 CP194 || 
|- id="2003 WG207" bgcolor=#d6d6d6
| 0 ||  || MBA-O || 17.0 || 2.2 km || multiple || 2003–2021 || 07 Jan 2021 || 51 || align=left | Disc.: Spacewatch || 
|- id="2003 WH207" bgcolor=#d6d6d6
| 0 ||  || MBA-O || 17.2 || 2.0 km || multiple || 2003–2019 || 05 Nov 2019 || 55 || align=left | Disc.: Kitt Peak Obs. || 
|- id="2003 WJ207" bgcolor=#d6d6d6
| 0 ||  || MBA-O || 17.6 || 1.7 km || multiple || 2003–2019 || 28 Oct 2019 || 48 || align=left | Disc.: SDSS || 
|- id="2003 WK207" bgcolor=#d6d6d6
| 2 ||  || MBA-O || 16.8 || 2.4 km || multiple || 2003–2018 || 10 Nov 2018 || 58 || align=left | Disc.: Spacewatch || 
|- id="2003 WL207" bgcolor=#d6d6d6
| 0 ||  || MBA-O || 16.69 || 2.6 km || multiple || 2003–2021 || 17 Apr 2021 || 81 || align=left | Disc.: Spacewatch || 
|- id="2003 WM207" bgcolor=#d6d6d6
| 0 ||  || MBA-O || 16.6 || 2.7 km || multiple || 2003–2019 || 29 Oct 2019 || 44 || align=left | Disc.: LPL/Spacewatch II || 
|- id="2003 WN207" bgcolor=#E9E9E9
| 0 ||  || MBA-M || 17.52 || 1.7 km || multiple || 2003–2021 || 07 Aug 2021 || 48 || align=left | Disc.: Spacewatch || 
|- id="2003 WO207" bgcolor=#E9E9E9
| 0 ||  || MBA-M || 17.75 || data-sort-value="0.84" | 840 m || multiple || 2003–2021 || 14 Apr 2021 || 57 || align=left | Disc.: SDSS || 
|- id="2003 WQ207" bgcolor=#d6d6d6
| 0 ||  || MBA-O || 17.0 || 2.2 km || multiple || 2003–2020 || 27 Jan 2020 || 63 || align=left | Disc.: Spacewatch || 
|- id="2003 WR207" bgcolor=#d6d6d6
| 0 ||  || MBA-O || 16.7 || 2.5 km || multiple || 2003–2020 || 23 Dec 2020 || 58 || align=left | Disc.: Spacewatch || 
|- id="2003 WS207" bgcolor=#E9E9E9
| 0 ||  || MBA-M || 17.7 || data-sort-value="0.86" | 860 m || multiple || 2003–2020 || 11 Dec 2020 || 53 || align=left | Disc.: Spacewatch || 
|- id="2003 WT207" bgcolor=#fefefe
| 0 ||  || MBA-I || 18.25 || data-sort-value="0.67" | 670 m || multiple || 2003–2021 || 09 Dec 2021 || 99 || align=left | Disc.: Spacewatch || 
|- id="2003 WU207" bgcolor=#fefefe
| 0 ||  || MBA-I || 18.97 || data-sort-value="0.48" | 480 m || multiple || 2003–2021 || 07 Apr 2021 || 74 || align=left | Disc.: Spacewatch || 
|- id="2003 WV207" bgcolor=#fefefe
| 0 ||  || MBA-I || 18.4 || data-sort-value="0.62" | 620 m || multiple || 2003–2019 || 24 Oct 2019 || 46 || align=left | Disc.: Spacewatch || 
|- id="2003 WW207" bgcolor=#E9E9E9
| 0 ||  || MBA-M || 17.4 || data-sort-value="0.98" | 980 m || multiple || 1995–2021 || 16 Jan 2021 || 55 || align=left | Disc.: LPL/Spacewatch II || 
|- id="2003 WX207" bgcolor=#fefefe
| 0 ||  || MBA-I || 18.98 || data-sort-value="0.48" | 480 m || multiple || 2003–2021 || 02 Dec 2021 || 48 || align=left | Disc.: Spacewatch || 
|- id="2003 WY207" bgcolor=#fefefe
| 0 ||  || MBA-I || 18.47 || data-sort-value="0.60" | 600 m || multiple || 2003–2021 || 30 Jun 2021 || 51 || align=left | Disc.: Spacewatch || 
|- id="2003 WZ207" bgcolor=#d6d6d6
| 0 ||  || MBA-O || 16.6 || 2.7 km || multiple || 2003–2019 || 02 Nov 2019 || 54 || align=left | Disc.: Spacewatch || 
|- id="2003 WA208" bgcolor=#E9E9E9
| 1 ||  || MBA-M || 18.4 || data-sort-value="0.62" | 620 m || multiple || 2003–2019 || 29 Oct 2019 || 53 || align=left | Disc.: Spacewatch || 
|- id="2003 WB208" bgcolor=#d6d6d6
| 0 ||  || MBA-O || 16.7 || 2.5 km || multiple || 2003–2020 || 11 Nov 2020 || 67 || align=left | Disc.: Kitt Peak Obs. || 
|- id="2003 WC208" bgcolor=#d6d6d6
| 0 ||  || MBA-O || 16.8 || 2.4 km || multiple || 2003–2020 || 10 Dec 2020 || 46 || align=left | Disc.: LPL/Spacewatch II || 
|- id="2003 WD208" bgcolor=#E9E9E9
| 3 ||  || MBA-M || 18.1 || data-sort-value="0.71" | 710 m || multiple || 2003–2019 || 19 Nov 2019 || 46 || align=left | Disc.: Kitt Peak Obs. || 
|- id="2003 WF208" bgcolor=#fefefe
| 0 ||  || MBA-I || 18.41 || data-sort-value="0.62" | 620 m || multiple || 2003–2021 || 31 Aug 2021 || 51 || align=left | Disc.: Spacewatch || 
|- id="2003 WG208" bgcolor=#fefefe
| 0 ||  || MBA-I || 19.06 || data-sort-value="0.46" | 460 m || multiple || 2003–2021 || 30 Sep 2021 || 47 || align=left | Disc.: Spacewatch || 
|- id="2003 WK208" bgcolor=#d6d6d6
| 0 ||  || MBA-O || 16.8 || 2.4 km || multiple || 2003–2021 || 24 Jan 2021 || 68 || align=left | Disc.: Spacewatch || 
|- id="2003 WL208" bgcolor=#fefefe
| 0 ||  || MBA-I || 18.64 || data-sort-value="0.56" | 560 m || multiple || 2003–2021 || 06 Nov 2021 || 63 || align=left | Disc.: Spacewatch || 
|- id="2003 WM208" bgcolor=#d6d6d6
| 0 ||  || MBA-O || 17.0 || 2.2 km || multiple || 2003–2019 || 27 Oct 2019 || 42 || align=left | Disc.: Spacewatch || 
|- id="2003 WN208" bgcolor=#fefefe
| 0 ||  || MBA-I || 19.47 || data-sort-value="0.38" | 380 m || multiple || 2003–2019 || 01 Oct 2019 || 37 || align=left | Disc.: Kitt Peak Obs. || 
|- id="2003 WO208" bgcolor=#d6d6d6
| 0 ||  || MBA-O || 17.3 || 1.9 km || multiple || 2003–2019 || 03 Dec 2019 || 46 || align=left | Disc.: Spacewatch || 
|- id="2003 WP208" bgcolor=#E9E9E9
| 0 ||  || MBA-M || 17.2 || 1.5 km || multiple || 2003–2021 || 12 Jan 2021 || 85 || align=left | Disc.: Spacewatch || 
|- id="2003 WQ208" bgcolor=#d6d6d6
| 0 ||  || MBA-O || 16.8 || 2.4 km || multiple || 2003–2021 || 07 Jan 2021 || 60 || align=left | Disc.: Spacewatch || 
|- id="2003 WR208" bgcolor=#E9E9E9
| 0 ||  || MBA-M || 17.17 || 2.0 km || multiple || 2003–2021 || 28 Oct 2021 || 72 || align=left | Disc.: SpacewatchAlt.: 2010 CO254, 2010 CV256 || 
|- id="2003 WT208" bgcolor=#E9E9E9
| 0 ||  || MBA-M || 17.74 || 1.6 km || multiple || 2003–2021 || 26 Oct 2021 || 76 || align=left | Disc.: Spacewatch || 
|- id="2003 WU208" bgcolor=#d6d6d6
| 0 ||  || MBA-O || 16.93 || 2.3 km || multiple || 2003–2021 || 14 Apr 2021 || 52 || align=left | Disc.: Spacewatch || 
|- id="2003 WV208" bgcolor=#fefefe
| 0 ||  || MBA-I || 18.37 || data-sort-value="0.63" | 630 m || multiple || 2003–2021 || 10 Sep 2021 || 48 || align=left | Disc.: Spacewatch || 
|- id="2003 WW208" bgcolor=#fefefe
| 0 ||  || MBA-I || 18.96 || data-sort-value="0.48" | 480 m || multiple || 2003–2021 || 01 Dec 2021 || 37 || align=left | Disc.: Spacewatch || 
|- id="2003 WX208" bgcolor=#fefefe
| 0 ||  || MBA-I || 18.3 || data-sort-value="0.65" | 650 m || multiple || 2003–2020 || 13 May 2020 || 44 || align=left | Disc.: Spacewatch || 
|- id="2003 WY208" bgcolor=#fefefe
| 0 ||  || MBA-I || 18.1 || data-sort-value="0.71" | 710 m || multiple || 2003–2020 || 21 Apr 2020 || 48 || align=left | Disc.: Spacewatch || 
|- id="2003 WZ208" bgcolor=#fefefe
| 0 ||  || MBA-I || 18.5 || data-sort-value="0.59" | 590 m || multiple || 2003–2018 || 03 Oct 2018 || 49 || align=left | Disc.: Spacewatch || 
|- id="2003 WA209" bgcolor=#E9E9E9
| 0 ||  || MBA-M || 17.0 || 1.7 km || multiple || 2003–2020 || 11 Dec 2020 || 97 || align=left | Disc.: SpacewatchAlt.: 2010 LP26 || 
|- id="2003 WB209" bgcolor=#d6d6d6
| 0 ||  || HIL || 15.8 || 3.9 km || multiple || 2003–2018 || 11 Nov 2018 || 37 || align=left | Disc.: Spacewatch || 
|- id="2003 WC209" bgcolor=#E9E9E9
| 1 ||  || MBA-M || 18.28 || data-sort-value="0.66" | 660 m || multiple || 2003–2021 || 12 Feb 2021 || 42 || align=left | Disc.: Kitt Peak Obs. || 
|- id="2003 WD209" bgcolor=#E9E9E9
| 0 ||  || MBA-M || 17.7 || 1.6 km || multiple || 2003–2020 || 12 Aug 2020 || 42 || align=left | Disc.: Kitt Peak Obs. || 
|- id="2003 WE209" bgcolor=#E9E9E9
| 2 ||  || MBA-M || 18.7 || data-sort-value="0.54" | 540 m || multiple || 2003–2019 || 01 Nov 2019 || 57 || align=left | Disc.: Spacewatch || 
|- id="2003 WF209" bgcolor=#E9E9E9
| 0 ||  || MBA-M || 17.0 || 1.7 km || multiple || 2003–2021 || 06 Jan 2021 || 68 || align=left | Disc.: Spacewatch || 
|- id="2003 WH209" bgcolor=#E9E9E9
| 0 ||  || MBA-M || 17.8 || 1.2 km || multiple || 2003–2020 || 14 Dec 2020 || 45 || align=left | Disc.: NEAT || 
|- id="2003 WK209" bgcolor=#fefefe
| 0 ||  || MBA-I || 18.5 || data-sort-value="0.59" | 590 m || multiple || 2003–2020 || 06 Dec 2020 || 54 || align=left | Disc.: Kitt Peak Obs. || 
|- id="2003 WL209" bgcolor=#d6d6d6
| 3 ||  || MBA-O || 17.5 || 1.8 km || multiple || 2003–2019 || 02 Jan 2019 || 36 || align=left | Disc.: Kitt Peak Obs. || 
|- id="2003 WM209" bgcolor=#d6d6d6
| 0 ||  || MBA-O || 17.0 || 2.2 km || multiple || 2003–2021 || 05 Jan 2021 || 52 || align=left | Disc.: NEAT || 
|- id="2003 WP209" bgcolor=#d6d6d6
| 0 ||  || MBA-O || 16.7 || 2.5 km || multiple || 2003–2020 || 24 Jan 2020 || 61 || align=left | Disc.: Kitt Peak Obs. || 
|- id="2003 WQ209" bgcolor=#fefefe
| 0 ||  || HUN || 19.0 || data-sort-value="0.47" | 470 m || multiple || 2003–2021 || 11 Jun 2021 || 57 || align=left | Disc.: LPL/Spacewatch II || 
|- id="2003 WR209" bgcolor=#fefefe
| 0 ||  || MBA-I || 18.6 || data-sort-value="0.57" | 570 m || multiple || 2003–2019 || 06 Jan 2019 || 33 || align=left | Disc.: Kitt Peak Obs. || 
|- id="2003 WS209" bgcolor=#fefefe
| 0 ||  || MBA-I || 18.6 || data-sort-value="0.57" | 570 m || multiple || 2003–2020 || 29 Jun 2020 || 32 || align=left | Disc.: Kitt Peak Obs. || 
|- id="2003 WT209" bgcolor=#fefefe
| 0 ||  || MBA-I || 18.73 || data-sort-value="0.53" | 530 m || multiple || 2003–2021 || 05 Oct 2021 || 56 || align=left | Disc.: Kitt Peak Obs. || 
|- id="2003 WU209" bgcolor=#d6d6d6
| 0 ||  || MBA-O || 16.4 || 2.9 km || multiple || 2003–2020 || 23 Nov 2020 || 50 || align=left | Disc.: Spacewatch || 
|- id="2003 WV209" bgcolor=#d6d6d6
| 2 ||  || MBA-O || 17.4 || 1.8 km || multiple || 2003–2018 || 27 Dec 2018 || 36 || align=left | Disc.: Spacewatch || 
|- id="2003 WW209" bgcolor=#fefefe
| 0 ||  || MBA-I || 18.8 || data-sort-value="0.52" | 520 m || multiple || 1996–2020 || 20 Oct 2020 || 69 || align=left | Disc.: Spacewatch || 
|- id="2003 WX209" bgcolor=#d6d6d6
| 0 ||  || MBA-O || 16.6 || 2.7 km || multiple || 2003–2020 || 20 Dec 2020 || 216 || align=left | Disc.: SDSS || 
|- id="2003 WY209" bgcolor=#E9E9E9
| 0 ||  || MBA-M || 17.46 || 1.8 km || multiple || 2003–2021 || 04 Dec 2021 || 115 || align=left | Disc.: Spacewatch || 
|- id="2003 WA210" bgcolor=#d6d6d6
| 0 ||  || MBA-O || 16.8 || 2.4 km || multiple || 2003–2020 || 15 Dec 2020 || 87 || align=left | Disc.: Spacewatch || 
|- id="2003 WB210" bgcolor=#d6d6d6
| 0 ||  || MBA-O || 16.4 || 2.9 km || multiple || 2003–2021 || 05 Jan 2021 || 101 || align=left | Disc.: SDSS || 
|- id="2003 WC210" bgcolor=#E9E9E9
| 2 ||  || MBA-M || 19.1 || data-sort-value="0.45" | 450 m || multiple || 2003–2019 || 02 Sep 2019 || 78 || align=left | Disc.: Kitt Peak Obs. || 
|- id="2003 WE210" bgcolor=#E9E9E9
| 1 ||  || MBA-M || 18.2 || data-sort-value="0.68" | 680 m || multiple || 2003–2020 || 22 Jan 2020 || 72 || align=left | Disc.: Spacewatch || 
|- id="2003 WF210" bgcolor=#d6d6d6
| 0 ||  || MBA-O || 17.00 || 2.2 km || multiple || 2003–2022 || 27 Jan 2022 || 65 || align=left | Disc.: Kitt Peak Obs. || 
|- id="2003 WG210" bgcolor=#fefefe
| 0 ||  || MBA-I || 18.2 || data-sort-value="0.68" | 680 m || multiple || 2003–2020 || 23 Aug 2020 || 84 || align=left | Disc.: Spacewatch || 
|- id="2003 WK210" bgcolor=#d6d6d6
| 0 ||  || MBA-O || 16.8 || 2.4 km || multiple || 2003–2020 || 10 Dec 2020 || 81 || align=left | Disc.: Spacewatch || 
|- id="2003 WL210" bgcolor=#E9E9E9
| 0 ||  || MBA-M || 17.9 || data-sort-value="0.78" | 780 m || multiple || 2003–2019 || 28 Sep 2019 || 58 || align=left | Disc.: Kitt Peak Obs. || 
|- id="2003 WP210" bgcolor=#d6d6d6
| 0 ||  || MBA-O || 17.0 || 2.2 km || multiple || 2003–2020 || 16 May 2020 || 88 || align=left | Disc.: Kitt Peak Obs. || 
|- id="2003 WQ210" bgcolor=#E9E9E9
| 0 ||  || MBA-M || 17.6 || data-sort-value="0.90" | 900 m || multiple || 2003–2021 || 18 Jan 2021 || 72 || align=left | Disc.: Spacewatch || 
|- id="2003 WR210" bgcolor=#E9E9E9
| 0 ||  || MBA-M || 18.2 || data-sort-value="0.68" | 680 m || multiple || 2003–2019 || 03 Oct 2019 || 68 || align=left | Disc.: Kitt Peak Obs. || 
|- id="2003 WU210" bgcolor=#E9E9E9
| 0 ||  || MBA-M || 17.04 || 2.2 km || multiple || 2003–2021 || 01 Nov 2021 || 94 || align=left | Disc.: SpacewatchAlt.: 2010 LH118 || 
|- id="2003 WV210" bgcolor=#d6d6d6
| 0 ||  || MBA-O || 16.59 || 2.7 km || multiple || 2003–2022 || 06 Jan 2022 || 115 || align=left | Disc.: SpacewatchAlt.: 2010 EE161, 2011 FZ95, 2011 FK169 || 
|- id="2003 WW210" bgcolor=#d6d6d6
| 0 ||  || MBA-O || 16.6 || 2.7 km || multiple || 2003–2020 || 08 Dec 2020 || 82 || align=left | Disc.: LPL/Spacewatch II || 
|- id="2003 WY210" bgcolor=#d6d6d6
| 0 ||  || MBA-O || 16.86 || 2.4 km || multiple || 2003–2021 || 18 Apr 2021 || 72 || align=left | Disc.: Spacewatch || 
|- id="2003 WZ210" bgcolor=#E9E9E9
| 0 ||  || MBA-M || 17.81 || 1.5 km || multiple || 1998–2021 || 28 Nov 2021 || 59 || align=left | Disc.: LPL/Spacewatch II || 
|- id="2003 WC211" bgcolor=#fefefe
| 0 ||  || MBA-I || 18.6 || data-sort-value="0.57" | 570 m || multiple || 2003–2020 || 14 Dec 2020 || 69 || align=left | Disc.: Kitt Peak Obs. || 
|- id="2003 WD211" bgcolor=#E9E9E9
| 0 ||  || MBA-M || 17.6 || 1.3 km || multiple || 2003–2021 || 10 Jan 2021 || 63 || align=left | Disc.: NEAT || 
|- id="2003 WE211" bgcolor=#d6d6d6
| 0 ||  || MBA-O || 16.8 || 2.4 km || multiple || 2002–2020 || 20 Oct 2020 || 42 || align=left | Disc.: Kitt Peak Obs. || 
|- id="2003 WG211" bgcolor=#E9E9E9
| 1 ||  || MBA-M || 17.7 || data-sort-value="0.86" | 860 m || multiple || 2003–2019 || 17 Dec 2019 || 37 || align=left | Disc.: Kitt Peak Obs. || 
|- id="2003 WJ211" bgcolor=#fefefe
| 0 ||  || MBA-I || 18.84 || data-sort-value="0.51" | 510 m || multiple || 2003–2021 || 16 Oct 2021 || 54 || align=left | Disc.: Spacewatch || 
|- id="2003 WK211" bgcolor=#E9E9E9
| 2 ||  || MBA-M || 18.6 || data-sort-value="0.57" | 570 m || multiple || 2003–2019 || 22 Sep 2019 || 39 || align=left | Disc.: Spacewatch || 
|- id="2003 WL211" bgcolor=#d6d6d6
| 0 ||  || MBA-O || 16.9 || 2.3 km || multiple || 2003–2020 || 27 Apr 2020 || 60 || align=left | Disc.: NEAT || 
|- id="2003 WN211" bgcolor=#E9E9E9
| 2 ||  || MBA-M || 18.6 || data-sort-value="0.57" | 570 m || multiple || 2003–2015 || 16 Aug 2015 || 33 || align=left | Disc.: Spacewatch || 
|- id="2003 WO211" bgcolor=#C2FFFF
| 0 ||  || JT || 14.4 || 7.3 km || multiple || 2003–2020 || 23 Jun 2020 || 41 || align=left | Disc.: Kitt Peak Obs.Trojan camp (L5) || 
|- id="2003 WP211" bgcolor=#fefefe
| 0 ||  || MBA-I || 18.4 || data-sort-value="0.62" | 620 m || multiple || 2003–2021 || 16 Jan 2021 || 53 || align=left | Disc.: Spacewatch || 
|- id="2003 WR211" bgcolor=#d6d6d6
| 0 ||  || MBA-O || 17.5 || 1.8 km || multiple || 2003–2021 || 11 Jun 2021 || 57 || align=left | Disc.: Kitt Peak Obs. || 
|- id="2003 WS211" bgcolor=#fefefe
| 0 ||  || MBA-I || 19.14 || data-sort-value="0.44" | 440 m || multiple || 2003–2021 || 03 Oct 2021 || 41 || align=left | Disc.: Kitt Peak Obs. || 
|- id="2003 WT211" bgcolor=#d6d6d6
| 1 ||  || MBA-O || 17.7 || 1.6 km || multiple || 2003–2019 || 27 Jan 2019 || 33 || align=left | Disc.: Spacewatch || 
|- id="2003 WV211" bgcolor=#d6d6d6
| 0 ||  || MBA-O || 17.0 || 2.2 km || multiple || 2003–2019 || 28 Aug 2019 || 29 || align=left | Disc.: Kitt Peak Obs. || 
|- id="2003 WW211" bgcolor=#fefefe
| 0 ||  || MBA-I || 18.2 || data-sort-value="0.68" | 680 m || multiple || 2003–2020 || 07 Dec 2020 || 71 || align=left | Disc.: Kitt Peak Obs. || 
|- id="2003 WX211" bgcolor=#E9E9E9
| 1 ||  || MBA-M || 18.5 || data-sort-value="0.59" | 590 m || multiple || 2003–2020 || 19 Jan 2020 || 76 || align=left | Disc.: Kitt Peak Obs. || 
|- id="2003 WA212" bgcolor=#d6d6d6
| 0 ||  || MBA-O || 16.85 || 2.4 km || multiple || 2003–2021 || 10 Apr 2021 || 65 || align=left | Disc.: Kitt Peak Obs. || 
|- id="2003 WB212" bgcolor=#d6d6d6
| 0 ||  || MBA-O || 16.7 || 2.5 km || multiple || 2003–2019 || 25 Nov 2019 || 54 || align=left | Disc.: Kitt Peak Obs. || 
|- id="2003 WC212" bgcolor=#d6d6d6
| 0 ||  || MBA-O || 16.7 || 2.5 km || multiple || 2002–2019 || 26 Nov 2019 || 53 || align=left | Disc.: SDSSAlt.: 2002 UV57 || 
|- id="2003 WD212" bgcolor=#fefefe
| 0 ||  || MBA-I || 18.53 || data-sort-value="0.58" | 580 m || multiple || 2003–2021 || 12 May 2021 || 87 || align=left | Disc.: Spacewatch || 
|- id="2003 WE212" bgcolor=#d6d6d6
| 0 ||  || MBA-O || 16.6 || 2.7 km || multiple || 2003–2020 || 17 Dec 2020 || 56 || align=left | Disc.: Spacewatch || 
|- id="2003 WF212" bgcolor=#d6d6d6
| 0 ||  || MBA-O || 16.2 || 3.2 km || multiple || 2003–2021 || 08 Jan 2021 || 125 || align=left | Disc.: SpacewatchAlt.: 2010 EX22 || 
|- id="2003 WG212" bgcolor=#d6d6d6
| 0 ||  || MBA-O || 17.0 || 2.2 km || multiple || 2003–2019 || 20 Sep 2019 || 39 || align=left | Disc.: Kitt Peak Obs. || 
|- id="2003 WH212" bgcolor=#d6d6d6
| 0 ||  || MBA-O || 17.4 || 1.8 km || multiple || 2003–2020 || 24 Dec 2020 || 47 || align=left | Disc.: Spacewatch || 
|- id="2003 WJ212" bgcolor=#E9E9E9
| 1 ||  || MBA-M || 18.3 || data-sort-value="0.65" | 650 m || multiple || 2003–2019 || 27 Sep 2019 || 39 || align=left | Disc.: Kitt Peak Obs. || 
|- id="2003 WK212" bgcolor=#E9E9E9
| 0 ||  || MBA-M || 18.31 || data-sort-value="0.92" | 920 m || multiple || 2003–2022 || 26 Jan 2022 || 44 || align=left | Disc.: Kitt Peak Obs. || 
|- id="2003 WL212" bgcolor=#fefefe
| 0 ||  || MBA-I || 18.3 || data-sort-value="0.65" | 650 m || multiple || 2003–2019 || 22 Jun 2019 || 42 || align=left | Disc.: Spacewatch || 
|- id="2003 WN212" bgcolor=#fefefe
| 0 ||  || MBA-I || 18.79 || data-sort-value="0.52" | 520 m || multiple || 2003–2021 || 11 Nov 2021 || 48 || align=left | Disc.: LPL/Spacewatch II || 
|- id="2003 WO212" bgcolor=#fefefe
| 0 ||  || MBA-I || 18.7 || data-sort-value="0.54" | 540 m || multiple || 2001–2020 || 10 Oct 2020 || 62 || align=left | Disc.: Spacewatch || 
|- id="2003 WP212" bgcolor=#E9E9E9
| 0 ||  || MBA-M || 18.0 || data-sort-value="0.75" | 750 m || multiple || 2003–2019 || 26 Sep 2019 || 44 || align=left | Disc.: Kitt Peak Obs. || 
|- id="2003 WQ212" bgcolor=#E9E9E9
| 0 ||  || MBA-M || 17.58 || 1.7 km || multiple || 2003–2021 || 31 Aug 2021 || 47 || align=left | Disc.: Spacewatch || 
|- id="2003 WR212" bgcolor=#fefefe
| 0 ||  || MBA-I || 18.8 || data-sort-value="0.52" | 520 m || multiple || 2003–2021 || 18 Jan 2021 || 40 || align=left | Disc.: Spacewatch || 
|- id="2003 WS212" bgcolor=#d6d6d6
| 0 ||  || MBA-O || 17.1 || 2.1 km || multiple || 2003–2021 || 06 Jan 2021 || 44 || align=left | Disc.: Kitt Peak Obs. || 
|- id="2003 WT212" bgcolor=#d6d6d6
| 0 ||  || MBA-O || 17.9 || 1.5 km || multiple || 2003–2019 || 28 Nov 2019 || 35 || align=left | Disc.: Spacewatch || 
|- id="2003 WU212" bgcolor=#d6d6d6
| 0 ||  || MBA-O || 16.7 || 2.5 km || multiple || 2003–2021 || 04 Jan 2021 || 37 || align=left | Disc.: Spacewatch || 
|- id="2003 WW212" bgcolor=#E9E9E9
| 0 ||  || MBA-M || 18.19 || 1.3 km || multiple || 2003–2021 || 11 Nov 2021 || 50 || align=left | Disc.: Spacewatch || 
|- id="2003 WX212" bgcolor=#d6d6d6
| 1 ||  || MBA-O || 17.2 || 2.0 km || multiple || 2003–2019 || 24 Sep 2019 || 32 || align=left | Disc.: Spacewatch || 
|- id="2003 WY212" bgcolor=#fefefe
| 0 ||  || MBA-I || 18.9 || data-sort-value="0.49" | 490 m || multiple || 2003–2020 || 05 Nov 2020 || 66 || align=left | Disc.: Spacewatch || 
|- id="2003 WA213" bgcolor=#E9E9E9
| 0 ||  || MBA-M || 17.4 || data-sort-value="0.98" | 980 m || multiple || 1993–2021 || 17 Jan 2021 || 77 || align=left | Disc.: Spacewatch || 
|- id="2003 WD213" bgcolor=#d6d6d6
| 0 ||  || MBA-O || 16.6 || 2.7 km || multiple || 2003–2021 || 07 Jun 2021 || 95 || align=left | Disc.: NEAT || 
|- id="2003 WF213" bgcolor=#fefefe
| 0 ||  || MBA-I || 18.5 || data-sort-value="0.59" | 590 m || multiple || 2003–2021 || 16 Jan 2021 || 67 || align=left | Disc.: Spacewatch || 
|- id="2003 WG213" bgcolor=#fefefe
| 0 ||  || MBA-I || 18.03 || data-sort-value="0.74" | 740 m || multiple || 2003–2021 || 28 Sep 2021 || 62 || align=left | Disc.: Spacewatch || 
|- id="2003 WJ213" bgcolor=#d6d6d6
| 0 ||  || MBA-O || 16.8 || 2.4 km || multiple || 2003–2021 || 07 Jan 2021 || 56 || align=left | Disc.: Spacewatch || 
|- id="2003 WL213" bgcolor=#d6d6d6
| 0 ||  || MBA-O || 16.9 || 2.3 km || multiple || 2003–2019 || 03 Dec 2019 || 47 || align=left | Disc.: Spacewatch || 
|- id="2003 WM213" bgcolor=#fefefe
| 1 ||  || MBA-I || 19.1 || data-sort-value="0.45" | 450 m || multiple || 2003–2020 || 25 Jan 2020 || 56 || align=left | Disc.: LPL/Spacewatch II || 
|- id="2003 WN213" bgcolor=#d6d6d6
| 0 ||  || MBA-O || 16.29 || 3.1 km || multiple || 2000–2021 || 05 Oct 2021 || 72 || align=left | Disc.: LPL/Spacewatch II || 
|- id="2003 WO213" bgcolor=#d6d6d6
| 0 ||  || HIL || 16.4 || 2.9 km || multiple || 2003–2020 || 22 Jan 2020 || 59 || align=left | Disc.: Spacewatch || 
|- id="2003 WP213" bgcolor=#d6d6d6
| 0 ||  || MBA-O || 17.5 || 1.8 km || multiple || 2003–2019 || 28 Nov 2019 || 41 || align=left | Disc.: LPL/Spacewatch II || 
|- id="2003 WQ213" bgcolor=#E9E9E9
| 1 ||  || MBA-M || 18.57 || data-sort-value="0.57" | 570 m || multiple || 2003–2021 || 07 Apr 2021 || 41 || align=left | Disc.: Spacewatch || 
|- id="2003 WR213" bgcolor=#E9E9E9
| 0 ||  || MBA-M || 17.54 || 1.7 km || multiple || 2003–2021 || 01 Nov 2021 || 72 || align=left | Disc.: Spacewatch || 
|- id="2003 WS213" bgcolor=#E9E9E9
| 0 ||  || MBA-M || 17.2 || 1.1 km || multiple || 2003–2021 || 15 Jan 2021 || 64 || align=left | Disc.: Spacewatch || 
|- id="2003 WT213" bgcolor=#d6d6d6
| 0 ||  || MBA-O || 17.01 || 2.2 km || multiple || 2003–2021 || 15 Apr 2021 || 65 || align=left | Disc.: SDSS || 
|- id="2003 WU213" bgcolor=#d6d6d6
| 0 ||  || MBA-O || 16.9 || 2.3 km || multiple || 2003–2021 || 07 Jan 2021 || 43 || align=left | Disc.: Kitt Peak Obs. || 
|- id="2003 WV213" bgcolor=#d6d6d6
| 0 ||  || MBA-O || 17.08 || 2.1 km || multiple || 2003–2022 || 26 Jan 2022 || 75 || align=left | Disc.: Kitt Peak Obs. || 
|- id="2003 WW213" bgcolor=#fefefe
| 1 ||  || MBA-I || 18.0 || data-sort-value="0.75" | 750 m || multiple || 2003–2020 || 24 Jan 2020 || 35 || align=left | Disc.: Spacewatch || 
|- id="2003 WX213" bgcolor=#d6d6d6
| 0 ||  || MBA-O || 16.6 || 2.7 km || multiple || 2003–2021 || 12 Jan 2021 || 50 || align=left | Disc.: Spacewatch || 
|- id="2003 WY213" bgcolor=#d6d6d6
| 0 ||  || MBA-O || 17.5 || 1.8 km || multiple || 2003–2020 || 25 Jan 2020 || 36 || align=left | Disc.: Spacewatch || 
|- id="2003 WA214" bgcolor=#d6d6d6
| 0 ||  || MBA-O || 16.5 || 2.8 km || multiple || 2003–2020 || 11 Dec 2020 || 70 || align=left | Disc.: Kitt Peak Obs. || 
|- id="2003 WB214" bgcolor=#fefefe
| 1 ||  || HUN || 18.8 || data-sort-value="0.52" | 520 m || multiple || 2003–2020 || 26 Jan 2020 || 37 || align=left | Disc.: SDSS || 
|- id="2003 WD214" bgcolor=#d6d6d6
| 2 ||  || MBA-O || 18.2 || 1.3 km || multiple || 2003–2018 || 13 Dec 2018 || 33 || align=left | Disc.: Kitt Peak Obs. || 
|- id="2003 WE214" bgcolor=#d6d6d6
| 0 ||  || MBA-O || 17.4 || 1.8 km || multiple || 2003–2019 || 28 Sep 2019 || 26 || align=left | Disc.: Spacewatch || 
|- id="2003 WF214" bgcolor=#d6d6d6
| 0 ||  || MBA-O || 17.2 || 2.0 km || multiple || 2003–2020 || 16 Dec 2020 || 39 || align=left | Disc.: Kitt Peak Obs. || 
|- id="2003 WG214" bgcolor=#E9E9E9
| 0 ||  || MBA-M || 17.91 || 1.5 km || multiple || 2003–2021 || 04 Oct 2021 || 63 || align=left | Disc.: Kitt Peak Obs. || 
|- id="2003 WH214" bgcolor=#d6d6d6
| 0 ||  || MBA-O || 17.27 || 2.0 km || multiple || 2003–2019 || 25 Sep 2019 || 311 || align=left | Disc.: Spacewatch || 
|- id="2003 WJ214" bgcolor=#fefefe
| 0 ||  || MBA-I || 18.7 || data-sort-value="0.54" | 540 m || multiple || 1995–2020 || 29 Feb 2020 || 48 || align=left | Disc.: SpacewatchAlt.: 1995 SE76 || 
|- id="2003 WK214" bgcolor=#d6d6d6
| 3 ||  || MBA-O || 17.9 || 1.5 km || multiple || 2003–2019 || 03 Dec 2019 || 21 || align=left | Disc.: SDSS || 
|- id="2003 WL214" bgcolor=#fefefe
| 0 ||  || MBA-I || 18.64 || data-sort-value="0.56" | 560 m || multiple || 2002–2021 || 16 Aug 2021 || 35 || align=left | Disc.: Spacewatch || 
|- id="2003 WM214" bgcolor=#d6d6d6
| 0 ||  || MBA-O || 17.38 || 1.9 km || multiple || 2003–2021 || 09 Apr 2021 || 47 || align=left | Disc.: SpacewatchAdded on 22 July 2020 || 
|- id="2003 WN214" bgcolor=#fefefe
| 0 ||  || MBA-I || 18.62 || data-sort-value="0.56" | 560 m || multiple || 2003–2021 || 08 Sep 2021 || 48 || align=left | Disc.: SpacewatchAdded on 22 July 2020 || 
|- id="2003 WO214" bgcolor=#E9E9E9
| 0 ||  || MBA-M || 18.05 || 1.0 km || multiple || 2003–2022 || 27 Jan 2022 || 56 || align=left | Disc.: SpacewatchAdded on 22 July 2020 || 
|- id="2003 WP214" bgcolor=#d6d6d6
| 0 ||  || MBA-O || 17.08 || 2.1 km || multiple || 2003–2021 || 10 Apr 2021 || 83 || align=left | Disc.: SpacewatchAdded on 22 July 2020 || 
|- id="2003 WQ214" bgcolor=#d6d6d6
| 0 ||  || MBA-O || 17.27 || 2.0 km || multiple || 2003–2021 || 09 Apr 2021 || 47 || align=left | Disc.: SpacewatchAdded on 22 July 2020 || 
|- id="2003 WR214" bgcolor=#d6d6d6
| 2 ||  || MBA-O || 17.2 || 2.0 km || multiple || 2003–2019 || 20 Dec 2019 || 29 || align=left | Disc.: SpacewatchAdded on 22 July 2020 || 
|- id="2003 WS214" bgcolor=#d6d6d6
| 0 ||  || MBA-O || 16.68 || 2.6 km || multiple || 2003–2022 || 25 Jan 2022 || 106 || align=left | Disc.: SpacewatchAdded on 22 July 2020Alt.: 2010 EO161 || 
|- id="2003 WT214" bgcolor=#fefefe
| 0 ||  || MBA-I || 18.43 || data-sort-value="0.61" | 610 m || multiple || 2003–2021 || 08 Sep 2021 || 66 || align=left | Disc.: SpacewatchAdded on 22 July 2020 || 
|- id="2003 WU214" bgcolor=#fefefe
| 0 ||  || MBA-I || 18.70 || data-sort-value="0.54" | 540 m || multiple || 2001–2021 || 18 Apr 2021 || 65 || align=left | Disc.: SpacewatchAdded on 22 July 2020 || 
|- id="2003 WW214" bgcolor=#d6d6d6
| 0 ||  || MBA-O || 17.19 || 2.0 km || multiple || 2003–2021 || 19 Apr 2021 || 58 || align=left | Disc.: SpacewatchAdded on 22 July 2020 || 
|- id="2003 WY214" bgcolor=#d6d6d6
| 1 ||  || HIL || 16.6 || 2.7 km || multiple || 1995–2018 || 18 Oct 2018 || 33 || align=left | Disc.: SpacewatchAdded on 22 July 2020 || 
|- id="2003 WA215" bgcolor=#E9E9E9
| 0 ||  || MBA-M || 17.67 || 1.2 km || multiple || 2003–2022 || 27 Jan 2022 || 42 || align=left | Disc.: SpacewatchAdded on 22 July 2020 || 
|- id="2003 WB215" bgcolor=#E9E9E9
| 0 ||  || MBA-M || 17.7 || 1.2 km || multiple || 2003–2020 || 07 Dec 2020 || 112 || align=left | Disc.: SpacewatchAdded on 22 July 2020 || 
|- id="2003 WD215" bgcolor=#E9E9E9
| 0 ||  || MBA-M || 17.88 || 1.5 km || multiple || 2001–2021 || 13 Jul 2021 || 32 || align=left | Disc.: SpacewatchAdded on 24 August 2020 || 
|- id="2003 WE215" bgcolor=#fefefe
| 0 ||  || MBA-I || 18.5 || data-sort-value="0.59" | 590 m || multiple || 2003–2020 || 11 Oct 2020 || 93 || align=left | Disc.: SDSSAdded on 13 September 2020 || 
|- id="2003 WF215" bgcolor=#fefefe
| 1 ||  || MBA-I || 19.1 || data-sort-value="0.45" | 450 m || multiple || 2003–2021 || 18 Jan 2021 || 37 || align=left | Disc.: SpacewatchAdded on 19 October 2020 || 
|- id="2003 WG215" bgcolor=#fefefe
| 0 ||  || MBA-I || 18.3 || data-sort-value="0.65" | 650 m || multiple || 2003–2021 || 02 Jan 2021 || 127 || align=left | Disc.: SpacewatchAdded on 19 October 2020 || 
|- id="2003 WH215" bgcolor=#fefefe
| 0 ||  || MBA-I || 18.6 || data-sort-value="0.57" | 570 m || multiple || 2003–2020 || 15 Sep 2020 || 75 || align=left | Disc.: SpacewatchAdded on 19 October 2020 || 
|- id="2003 WJ215" bgcolor=#fefefe
| 0 ||  || MBA-I || 18.8 || data-sort-value="0.52" | 520 m || multiple || 2002–2020 || 15 Oct 2020 || 58 || align=left | Disc.: NEATAdded on 19 October 2020 || 
|- id="2003 WK215" bgcolor=#fefefe
| 0 ||  || MBA-I || 18.23 || data-sort-value="0.67" | 670 m || multiple || 2003–2022 || 27 Jan 2022 || 68 || align=left | Disc.: NEATAdded on 19 October 2020 || 
|- id="2003 WL215" bgcolor=#fefefe
| 0 ||  || MBA-I || 18.55 || data-sort-value="0.58" | 580 m || multiple || 2003–2021 || 15 Apr 2021 || 55 || align=left | Disc.: SpacewatchAdded on 19 October 2020 || 
|- id="2003 WM215" bgcolor=#fefefe
| 0 ||  || MBA-I || 18.6 || data-sort-value="0.57" | 570 m || multiple || 2003–2020 || 09 Oct 2020 || 65 || align=left | Disc.: LPL/Spacewatch IIAdded on 19 October 2020 || 
|- id="2003 WN215" bgcolor=#d6d6d6
| 0 ||  || MBA-O || 16.5 || 2.8 km || multiple || 2002–2021 || 20 Mar 2021 || 71 || align=left | Disc.: SpacewatchAdded on 19 October 2020 || 
|- id="2003 WO215" bgcolor=#d6d6d6
| 0 ||  || MBA-O || 16.82 || 2.4 km || multiple || 2003–2021 || 09 Jul 2021 || 90 || align=left | Disc.: SpacewatchAdded on 19 October 2020Alt.: 2010 JH106 || 
|- id="2003 WP215" bgcolor=#fefefe
| 1 ||  || MBA-I || 18.7 || data-sort-value="0.54" | 540 m || multiple || 2003–2020 || 14 Sep 2020 || 43 || align=left | Disc.: SpacewatchAdded on 19 October 2020 || 
|- id="2003 WR215" bgcolor=#d6d6d6
| 0 ||  || MBA-O || 16.97 || 2.2 km || multiple || 1998–2021 || 13 Apr 2021 || 48 || align=left | Disc.: LPL/Spacewatch IIAdded on 19 October 2020 || 
|- id="2003 WS215" bgcolor=#E9E9E9
| 0 ||  || MBA-M || 18.0 || 1.1 km || multiple || 2003–2021 || 03 Jan 2021 || 59 || align=left | Disc.: SpacewatchAdded on 19 October 2020 || 
|- id="2003 WT215" bgcolor=#E9E9E9
| 1 ||  || MBA-M || 18.5 || data-sort-value="0.84" | 840 m || multiple || 2003–2020 || 11 Oct 2020 || 40 || align=left | Disc.: SDSSAdded on 19 October 2020 || 
|- id="2003 WU215" bgcolor=#E9E9E9
| 4 ||  || MBA-M || 18.6 || 1.1 km || multiple || 2003–2017 || 21 Nov 2017 || 18 || align=left | Disc.: LPL/Spacewatch IIAdded on 19 October 2020 || 
|- id="2003 WV215" bgcolor=#d6d6d6
| 0 ||  || MBA-O || 17.0 || 2.2 km || multiple || 2003–2020 || 13 Nov 2020 || 128 || align=left | Disc.: SpacewatchAdded on 17 January 2021 || 
|- id="2003 WW215" bgcolor=#E9E9E9
| 1 ||  || MBA-M || 18.3 || data-sort-value="0.92" | 920 m || multiple || 2003–2020 || 12 Dec 2020 || 60 || align=left | Disc.: SpacewatchAdded on 17 January 2021 || 
|- id="2003 WX215" bgcolor=#E9E9E9
| 0 ||  || MBA-M || 17.47 || 1.3 km || multiple || 2003–2022 || 25 Jan 2022 || 67 || align=left | Disc.: SpacewatchAdded on 17 January 2021Alt.: 2010 CW218, 2010 OH92 || 
|- id="2003 WY215" bgcolor=#E9E9E9
| 0 ||  || MBA-M || 18.2 || data-sort-value="0.96" | 960 m || multiple || 2003–2020 || 11 Oct 2020 || 53 || align=left | Disc.: SDSSAdded on 17 January 2021 || 
|- id="2003 WZ215" bgcolor=#d6d6d6
| 0 ||  || MBA-O || 16.7 || 2.5 km || multiple || 2002–2021 || 06 Feb 2021 || 77 || align=left | Disc.: SpacewatchAdded on 17 January 2021 || 
|- id="2003 WA216" bgcolor=#E9E9E9
| 0 ||  || MBA-M || 17.3 || 1.5 km || multiple || 2003–2020 || 14 Dec 2020 || 76 || align=left | Disc.: SpacewatchAdded on 17 January 2021 || 
|- id="2003 WB216" bgcolor=#E9E9E9
| 2 ||  || MBA-M || 18.1 || 1.0 km || multiple || 2003–2020 || 16 Oct 2020 || 45 || align=left | Disc.: SpacewatchAdded on 17 January 2021 || 
|- id="2003 WC216" bgcolor=#E9E9E9
| 0 ||  || MBA-M || 17.9 || 1.1 km || multiple || 2003–2020 || 21 Oct 2020 || 46 || align=left | Disc.: SpacewatchAdded on 17 January 2021 || 
|- id="2003 WD216" bgcolor=#E9E9E9
| 0 ||  || MBA-M || 17.1 || 1.6 km || multiple || 2003–2021 || 16 Jan 2021 || 91 || align=left | Disc.: SpacewatchAdded on 17 January 2021 || 
|- id="2003 WE216" bgcolor=#E9E9E9
| 1 ||  || MBA-M || 17.8 || 1.2 km || multiple || 2003–2021 || 11 Jan 2021 || 51 || align=left | Disc.: SpacewatchAdded on 17 January 2021 || 
|- id="2003 WG216" bgcolor=#E9E9E9
| 2 ||  || MBA-M || 18.1 || 1.0 km || multiple || 2003–2021 || 16 Jan 2021 || 79 || align=left | Disc.: SpacewatchAdded on 17 January 2021 || 
|- id="2003 WH216" bgcolor=#E9E9E9
| 0 ||  || MBA-M || 17.8 || 1.2 km || multiple || 2003–2020 || 16 Nov 2020 || 54 || align=left | Disc.: LPL/Spacewatch IIAdded on 17 January 2021 || 
|- id="2003 WJ216" bgcolor=#E9E9E9
| 1 ||  || MBA-M || 17.7 || 1.2 km || multiple || 2003–2020 || 11 Dec 2020 || 49 || align=left | Disc.: SpacewatchAdded on 17 January 2021 || 
|- id="2003 WK216" bgcolor=#E9E9E9
| 0 ||  || MBA-M || 16.9 || 1.8 km || multiple || 2003–2021 || 14 Jan 2021 || 56 || align=left | Disc.: SpacewatchAdded on 17 January 2021 || 
|- id="2003 WL216" bgcolor=#d6d6d6
| 0 ||  || MBA-O || 17.11 || 2.1 km || multiple || 2003–2022 || 26 Jan 2022 || 54 || align=left | Disc.: SpacewatchAdded on 17 January 2021 || 
|- id="2003 WR216" bgcolor=#d6d6d6
| 0 ||  || MBA-O || 17.1 || 2.1 km || multiple || 2001–2021 || 07 Jan 2021 || 44 || align=left | Disc.: SpacewatchAdded on 17 January 2021 || 
|- id="2003 WS216" bgcolor=#d6d6d6
| 0 ||  || MBA-O || 17.19 || 2.0 km || multiple || 2003–2022 || 07 Jan 2022 || 41 || align=left | Disc.: LPL/Spacewatch IIAdded on 17 January 2021 || 
|- id="2003 WT216" bgcolor=#d6d6d6
| 0 ||  || MBA-O || 17.0 || 2.2 km || multiple || 2003–2020 || 07 Dec 2020 || 35 || align=left | Disc.: SpacewatchAdded on 17 January 2021 || 
|- id="2003 WU216" bgcolor=#E9E9E9
| 2 ||  || MBA-M || 18.7 || data-sort-value="0.76" | 760 m || multiple || 2003–2020 || 10 Dec 2020 || 34 || align=left | Disc.: SpacewatchAdded on 17 January 2021 || 
|- id="2003 WV216" bgcolor=#d6d6d6
| 2 ||  || MBA-O || 18.1 || 1.3 km || multiple || 2003–2020 || 07 Dec 2020 || 31 || align=left | Disc.: SpacewatchAdded on 9 March 2021 || 
|- id="2003 WW216" bgcolor=#d6d6d6
| 1 ||  || MBA-O || 16.9 || 2.3 km || multiple || 2003–2021 || 06 Jan 2021 || 32 || align=left | Disc.: SpacewatchAdded on 9 March 2021 || 
|- id="2003 WY216" bgcolor=#fefefe
| 0 ||  || MBA-I || 19.39 || data-sort-value="0.39" | 390 m || multiple || 1999–2021 || 13 Jul 2021 || 24 || align=left | Disc.: SpacewatchAdded on 9 March 2021 || 
|- id="2003 WA217" bgcolor=#fefefe
| 0 ||  || MBA-I || 18.89 || data-sort-value="0.50" | 500 m || multiple || 1996–2021 || 13 Apr 2021 || 69 || align=left | Disc.: SpacewatchAdded on 11 May 2021 || 
|- id="2003 WB217" bgcolor=#fefefe
| 0 ||  || HUN || 18.89 || data-sort-value="0.50" | 500 m || multiple || 2003–2021 || 10 May 2021 || 27 || align=left | Disc.: SpacewatchAdded on 11 May 2021 || 
|- id="2003 WC217" bgcolor=#E9E9E9
| 0 ||  || MBA-M || 18.18 || data-sort-value="0.97" | 970 m || multiple || 1998–2022 || 06 Jan 2022 || 32 || align=left | Disc.: Kitt Peak Obs.Added on 17 June 2021 || 
|- id="2003 WD217" bgcolor=#d6d6d6
| 0 ||  || MBA-O || 16.8 || 2.4 km || multiple || 2003–2021 || 11 May 2021 || 47 || align=left | Disc.: SpacewatchAdded on 17 June 2021 || 
|- id="2003 WG217" bgcolor=#fefefe
| 0 ||  || MBA-I || 18.61 || data-sort-value="0.56" | 560 m || multiple || 2003–2018 || 05 Oct 2018 || 35 || align=left | Disc.: SpacewatchAdded on 21 August 2021 || 
|- id="2003 WH217" bgcolor=#fefefe
| 0 ||  || MBA-I || 18.97 || data-sort-value="0.48" | 480 m || multiple || 2003–2022 || 10 Jan 2022 || 31 || align=left | Disc.: SpacewatchAdded on 21 August 2021 || 
|- id="2003 WJ217" bgcolor=#fefefe
| 0 ||  || MBA-I || 18.6 || data-sort-value="0.57" | 570 m || multiple || 2003–2020 || 27 Apr 2020 || 35 || align=left | Disc.: SpacewatchAdded on 21 August 2021 || 
|- id="2003 WK217" bgcolor=#fefefe
| 1 ||  || MBA-I || 18.2 || data-sort-value="0.68" | 680 m || multiple || 2001–2021 || 04 Jan 2021 || 61 || align=left | Disc.: NEATAdded on 21 August 2021 || 
|- id="2003 WL217" bgcolor=#E9E9E9
| 0 ||  || MBA-M || 17.79 || 1.5 km || multiple || 2003–2021 || 02 Oct 2021 || 41 || align=left | Disc.: SpacewatchAdded on 21 August 2021 || 
|- id="2003 WM217" bgcolor=#fefefe
| 0 ||  || MBA-I || 18.28 || data-sort-value="0.66" | 660 m || multiple || 1992–2021 || 03 Dec 2021 || 175 || align=left | Disc.: SpacewatchAdded on 30 September 2021 || 
|- id="2003 WN217" bgcolor=#E9E9E9
| 0 ||  || MBA-M || 17.96 || 1.4 km || multiple || 2003–2021 || 04 Oct 2021 || 43 || align=left | Disc.: SpacewatchAdded on 30 September 2021 || 
|- id="2003 WO217" bgcolor=#fefefe
| 0 ||  || MBA-I || 18.32 || data-sort-value="0.64" | 640 m || multiple || 2003–2020 || 16 Oct 2020 || 32 || align=left | Disc.: SDSSAdded on 5 November 2021 || 
|- id="2003 WP217" bgcolor=#fefefe
| 0 ||  || MBA-I || 19.4 || data-sort-value="0.39" | 390 m || multiple || 2003–2021 || 11 Feb 2021 || 34 || align=left | Disc.: SpacewatchAdded on 5 November 2021 || 
|- id="2003 WQ217" bgcolor=#E9E9E9
| 0 ||  || MBA-M || 17.67 || 1.6 km || multiple || 2003–2021 || 19 Nov 2021 || 80 || align=left | Disc.: SDSSAdded on 5 November 2021 || 
|- id="2003 WR217" bgcolor=#fefefe
| 0 ||  || MBA-I || 18.94 || data-sort-value="0.48" | 480 m || multiple || 2003–2021 || 29 Nov 2021 || 66 || align=left | Disc.: SpacewatchAdded on 5 November 2021 || 
|- id="2003 WS217" bgcolor=#fefefe
| 0 ||  || MBA-I || 18.62 || data-sort-value="0.56" | 560 m || multiple || 2003–2021 || 02 Dec 2021 || 70 || align=left | Disc.: SDSSAdded on 24 December 2021 || 
|- id="2003 WT217" bgcolor=#fefefe
| 0 ||  || MBA-I || 18.40 || data-sort-value="0.62" | 620 m || multiple || 2003–2022 || 06 Jan 2022 || 97 || align=left | Disc.: NEATAdded on 24 December 2021 || 
|- id="2003 WU217" bgcolor=#fefefe
| 2 ||  || MBA-I || 19.1 || data-sort-value="0.45" | 450 m || multiple || 2003–2021 || 09 Nov 2021 || 32 || align=left | Disc.: SpacewatchAdded on 24 December 2021 || 
|- id="2003 WV217" bgcolor=#E9E9E9
| 0 ||  || MBA-M || 17.74 || 1.6 km || multiple || 2003–2021 || 27 Dec 2021 || 41 || align=left | Disc.: SpacewatchAdded on 24 December 2021 || 
|- id="2003 WW217" bgcolor=#E9E9E9
| 3 ||  || MBA-M || 17.9 || 1.5 km || multiple || 2003–2021 || 09 Dec 2021 || 25 || align=left | Disc.: SpacewatchAdded on 24 December 2021 || 
|- id="2003 WX217" bgcolor=#d6d6d6
| 0 ||  || MBA-O || 17.2 || 2.0 km || multiple || 2003–2021 || 16 Jan 2021 || 28 || align=left | Disc.: SpacewatchAdded on 24 December 2021 || 
|- id="2003 WY217" bgcolor=#E9E9E9
| 2 ||  || MBA-M || 17.9 || 1.5 km || multiple || 2003–2020 || 23 Aug 2020 || 26 || align=left | Disc.: No observationsAdded on 29 January 2022 || 
|}
back to top

References 
 

Lists of unnumbered minor planets